Hangeul matchumbeop(한글맞춤법) refers to the overall rules of writing the Korean language with Hangul. The current orthography was issued and established by Korean Ministry of Culture in 1998. The first of it is Hunminjungeum(훈민정음). In everyday conversation, 한글 맞춤법 is referred to as 맞춤법.

Korean orthography rule (한글 맞춤법) consists of six chapters, along with appendix.

 Chapter 1: 총칙 (General Rule)
 Chapter 2: 자모 (Consonants and Vowels)
 Chapter 3: 소리에 관한 것 (About Sounds)
 Section 1, Chapter 3: 된소리 (doen-so-ri) 
 Section 2, Chapter 3: 구개음화 (Gu-gae-eum-hwa)
 Section 3, Chapter 3: ㄷ 받침소리 (Consonant 'ㄷ' coming at the lower part of a syllable)
 Section 4, Chapter 3: 모음 (Vowels)
 Section 5, Chapter 3: 두음법칙 (Law of Initial Sound of a Syllable)
 Section 6, Chapter 3: 겹쳐 나는 소리 (Sounds Pronounced When Similar Phoneme are Huddled Together)
 Chapter 4: 형태에 관한 것 (About Forms) 
 Section 1, Chapter 4: 체언과 조사 (Che-eon and Josa)
 Section 2, Chapter 4: 어간과 어미 (Stem and Ending of Verbs and Adjectives)
 Section 3, Chapter 4: 접미사가 붙어서 된 말 (Words Formed by Suffix is Attached to Other Words)
 Chapter 5: 띄어쓰기 (Spacing Between Words)
 Section 1, Chapter 5: 조사 (josa)
 Section 2, Chapter 5: 의존명사, 단위를 나타내는 명사 및 열거하는 말 등 (Bounding Nouns, Nouns *Expressing Units, Enumerating Words, Etc.)
 Section 3, Chapter 5: 보조용언 (Auxiliary verbs and Adjectives)
 Section 4, Chapter 5: 고유명사 및 전문용어 (Proper Nouns and Terminology)
 Chapter 6: 그 밖의 것 (Anything Else)
 Appendix: 문장부호 (Punctuation Marks)

External links
 Orthography guidelines issued by the Korean Ministry of Culture in 1988 at the Korean Wikisource
 Orthography guidelines issued by the Korean Ministry of Culture in 1988 at ko.wiktionary.org (online version, in Korean)
Orthographies by language
Orthography
Orthography